The "Y" service was a network of British signals intelligence collection sites, the Y-stations. The service was established during the First World War and used again during the Second World War. The sites were operated by a range of agencies including the Army, Navy and RAF plus the Foreign Office (MI6 and MI5), General Post Office and Marconi Company receiving stations ashore and afloat. There were more than 600 receiving sets in use at Y-stations during the Second World War.

Background
The "Y" stations tended to be of two types, for intercepting of the signals and for identifying where they were coming from. Sometimes both functions were operated at the same site, with the direction finding (D/F) hut being a few hundred metres from the main interception building, because of the need to minimise interference. The sites collected radio traffic which was then either analysed locally or if encrypted, passed for processing initially to the Admiralty Room 40 in London and during World War II to the Government Code and Cypher School at Bletchley Park in Buckinghamshire.

In the Second World War a large house called "Arkley View" on the outskirts of Barnet (now part of the London Borough of Barnet) acted as a data collection centre, where traffic was collated and passed to Bletchley Park and it also acted as a Y station. Many amateur radio (ham) operators supported the work of the Y stations, being enrolled as "Voluntary Interceptors".

Much of the traffic intercepted by the Y stations was recorded by hand and sent to Bletchley by motorcycle couriers, and later by teleprinter over post office land lines. The name derived from Wireless Interception (WI). The term was also used for similar stations attached to the India outpost of the Intelligence Corps, the Wireless Experimental Centre (WEC) outside Delhi.

Direction-finding Y stations
Specially constructed Y stations undertook High-frequency direction finding of wireless transmissions. This became particularly important in the Battle of the Atlantic where locating U-boats was vital. Admiral Dönitz told his commanders that they could not be located if they limited their wireless transmissions to under 30 seconds but skilled D/F operators were able to locate the origin of their signals in as few as six seconds. The design of land-based D/F stations preferred by the Allies during the Second World War was the U-Adcock system, which consisted of a small, central operators' hut that was surrounded by four  vertical aerial poles, usually placed at the points of the compass. Aerial feeders ran underground, surfaced in the centre of the hut and were connected to a direction finding goniometer and a wireless receiver, that allowed the bearing of the signal source to be measured. In the UK some operators were located in an underground metal tank. These stations were usually in remote places, often in the middle of farmers' fields. Traces of Second World War D/F stations can be seen as circles in the fields surrounding the village of Goonhavern in Cornwall.

Y station sites in Britain

 Beachy Head, Sussex
 Beaumanor Hall, near Loughborough, Leicestershire (operated by the Army)
 Beeston Hill, Beeston Regis, Norfolk
 Bishop's Waltham, Hampshire  (operated by the Army)
 Brora, Sutherland
 RAF Canterbury, Kent
 RAF Cheadle, Cheadle, Staffordshire
 RAF Chicksands, Bedfordshire (operated by the RAF)
 RAF Clophill, Bedfordshire
 Cromer, Norfolk
 Forest Moor, near Harrogate (operated by the Army)
 G.P.O. Transatlantic Radiophone Station Kemback, near Cupar Fife
 Denmark Hill, Camberwell (operated by the Metropolitan Police and General Post Office (GPO) for the Foreign Office )
 Met Office Dunstable, Bedfordshire
 Felixstowe, Suffolk
 Gilnahirk, Belfast
 Gorleston, Norfolk
 Hall Place, Kent
 Harpenden, Hertfordshire (Army, No. 1 Special Wireless Group)
 Hawklaw, Fife
 HMS Flowerdown, Winchester, Hampshire
 HMS Forest Moor, Harrogate, Yorkshire
 Kedleston Hall, Derbyshire
 RAF Kingsdown, Hollywood Manor, West Kingsdown, Kent
 RAF Monks Risborough, Monks Risborough, Buckinghamshire
 Knockholt, Kent (run by the Foreign Office for Non-Morse radiotelegraphy signals)
 Markyate, Hertfordshire (operated by the Army)
 Newbold Revel, RAF 'Y' Service Secret Intelligence and German Telephony Communications Base, Warwickshire.
 North Walsham, Norfolk
 Sandridge, Hertfordshire (operated by the Foreign Office)
 Saxmundham, Suffolk
 Scarborough, Yorkshire (operated by the Royal Navy)
 Shenley Brook End Milton Keynes (operated by the Army)
 South Walsham, Norfolk
 Southwold, Suffolk
 Stockland Bristol Nr Bridgwater, Somerset
 Stockton-on-Tees, Cleveland
 HMS Ventnor, Rew Down, Isle of Wight
 RAF Waddington, Lincolnshire
 Whitchurch, Shropshire in The Old Rectory, Claypit Street (operated by the Foreign Office)
 Wick (operated by the RAF)
 Wincombe, Donhead St Mary, Wiltshire (operated by the General Post Office (GPO) for the Foreign Office)

See also
 High frequency direction finding (Huff-Duff)

References

Bibliography

Further reading

External links
 Garats HaY—Y Services
 Beaumanor Park—Leicestershire
 Bletchley Park—Official Website
 Chicksands in WW2—BBC 3CR
 Bomber Command 'Y'—AWM

Cryptography organizations
Bletchley Park
Military history of Norfolk
Signals intelligence of World War I
Signals intelligence of World War II